HMS Blackwood was a Captain-class frigate of the Evarts-class of destroyer escort, originally commissioned to be built for the U.S. Navy. Before she was finished in 1942, she was transferred to the Royal Navy under the terms of Lend-Lease, and saw service during the Second World War.

Career
Blackwood was built by Boston Navy Yard, Massachusetts, United States and commissioned into the Royal Navy on 27 March 1943. She saw service on anti-submarine patrols and as a convoy escort.

Blackwood was hit and damaged, killing 57 of the crew. She was taken under tow, but foundered off Portland Bill the following day.

References
 
 HMS Blackwood at Uboat.net
 HMS Blackwood at Captain-class frigate association
 MoD announcement of designation

 

Captain-class frigates
World War II frigates of the United Kingdom
Protected Wrecks of the United Kingdom
Ships built in Boston
1942 ships
Evarts-class destroyer escorts
Ships transferred from the United States Navy to the Royal Navy
Ships sunk by German submarines in World War II
World War II shipwrecks in the Atlantic Ocean
Maritime incidents in June 1944